Lori Fung Methorst,  (馮黎明; born February 21, 1963) is a Canadian gymnastics coach and retired rhythmic gymnast. She won the gold medal in all-around rhythmic gymnastics at the 1984 Summer Olympics, the year the sport was introduced to the Olympics.

Early life 
Fung was born and raised in Vancouver, Canada. She was part of her elementary school gymnastics club. One of her teachers noticed her level of skill and suggested she try rhythmic gymnastics. She began training in the sport in 1976. She is of Chinese descent.

Career 
She was a three-time Canadian rhythmic gymnastics champion prior to her Olympic debut in 1984. The year before the Olympics, she placed 23rd at the world championships, but was able to raise her ranking in subsequent meets in order to qualify for the games.

Rhythmic gymnastics was officially added as an Olympic sport at the 1984 Olympic Games. That year, the gymnasts from Bulgaria and USSR were favored to win, but the Eastern led Boycott of the 1984 Summer Olympics meant the top gymnasts were absent from the competition. Fung trained with Romanian rhythmic gymnast Doina Stăiculescu who was, as a result of the boycott, the highest ranking rhythmic gymnast competing at the inaugural Olympic event. Fung finished in third place during qualification behind Stăiculescu and her Romanian teammate, Aline Dragan, who finished first and second respectively. In the final, Fung upset the Romanian team to become the first gymnast to win an Olympic gold medal in rhythmic gymnastics.

Fung retired from competition in 1988. She went on to become a coach, including a role as national team coach for Canada, and to co-own a Vancouver gymnastics club.

Personal life 
Fung married Dean Methorst in 1996. They have three children.

Honours
 In 1985, she was inducted into the BC Sports Hall of Fame.
In 1985, she was made a Member of the Order of Canada.
 In 1990, she was awarded the Order of British Columbia.
 In 2004, she was inducted into Canada's Sports Hall of Fame.

References

External links 
 

1963 births
Canadian rhythmic gymnasts
Gymnasts at the 1984 Summer Olympics
Living people
Canadian sportspeople of Chinese descent
Members of the Order of British Columbia
Members of the Order of Canada
Olympic gold medalists for Canada
Olympic gymnasts of Canada
Olympic medalists in gymnastics
Sportspeople from Vancouver
Medalists at the 1984 Summer Olympics
20th-century Canadian women